An embryo is an organism early in its development.

Embryo may also refer to:
 Embryo (film), a 1976 American film starring Rock Hudson
 Embryo (band), a German progressive rock band
 "Embryo", from the Black Sabbath album Master of Reality
 Embryo (Dir En Grey song), 2001
 "Embryo" (Pink Floyd song), 1970
 Embryo Records, record label from the 1970s
 Embryo (video game), a 1994 video game published for the Amiga
 Proto-state or state embryo, a state in development